Overholser may refer to:

People
 Henry Overholser, American businessman
 Ed Overholser, American politician and former mayor of Oklahoma City
 Geneva Overholser, American journalist
 Wayne D. Overholser, American writer
 Winfred Overholser, American psychiatrist

Places
 Lake Overholser, Oklahoma, United States
 Overholser Mansion, Oklahoma, United States